Hontao-ike Dam  is an earthfill dam located in Hiroshima Prefecture in Japan. The dam is used for irrigation. The catchment area of the dam is 1 km2. The dam can store 12 thousand cubic meters of water. The construction of the dam was completed in 1962.

References

Dams in Hiroshima Prefecture